Philip J. Morrison is an American professor in physics at the Institute for Fusion Studies at the University of Texas.

He attended the University of California, San Diego, receiving a B.S. in 1972, M.S. in 1974. He received his Ph.D. under the supervision of Prof. William Thompson at the University of California, San Diego in 1979.

His interests are in fluid physics, plasma physics and mathematical physics, including basic nonlinear plasma dynamics, Hamiltonian dynamics of both finite- and infinite-degree-of-freedom systems, and fluid mechanics. He discovered several brackets, including those for magnetohydrodynamics and the Vlasov-Maxwell equations.

He is a fellow of the American Physical Society.

He is married to Laura Morrison, who has served on the Austin, TX city council.

References

External links
Philip J. Morrison at the University of Texas

21st-century American physicists
Living people
University of California, San Diego alumni
University of Texas faculty
Year of birth missing (living people)
Fellows of the American Physical Society